Hargrove "Skipper" Bowles Jr. (November 16, 1919 – September 7, 1986) was an American Democratic politician and businessman, based in Greensboro, North Carolina.

Early life 
Hargrove Bowles Jr. was born on November 16, 1919 in Monroe, North Carolina. His father was a banker. When the bank he managed closed during the Great Depression, the Bowles family moved to Greensboro. Hargrove completed high school in Monroe, earning the nickname "Skipper" while he managed the school's football team. While in Monroe he befriended future politician Jesse Helms.

Bowles enrolled at the University of North Carolina at Chapel Hill in the 1937 fall semester and briefly lived as a roommate of Terry Sanford. While a student he worked in a dining hall before becoming a manager of a clothing store in downtown Chapel Hill. Bowles also led a dance band in which he played the trumpet, served on the university's honor council, and was a staff member of the student humor magazine, The Buccaneer. Involved in student politics, he served as class president during his sophomore year. He left the university one semester before getting a degree to attend a school on insurance run by the Hartford Accident & Indemnity Company in Hartford, Connecticut. In 1941 he returned to Greensboro and married Jessamine Boyce. He had four children with her. He served in the United States Army from 1943 to 1945, being discharged at the rank of corporal.

Business career 
Following his marriage, Bowles joined the management staff of wholesale grocer Thomas & Howard, where his father-in-law served as president. Working his way up through the company, he served as its vice president from 1948 to 1952 before being elevated to the presidency upon his father-in-law's death. He sold his interest in the company in 1958.

In 1956 Bowles started the Bowles Realty and Insurance Company. In 1965 he became chairman of an investment bank.

Political career

North Carolina Department of Conservation and Development 

Bowles served as finance director for Terry Sanford's gubernatorial campaign in 1960. In January 1961, Sanford, who had been elected governor of North Carolina, appointed Bowles director of the Department of Conservation and Development. He was sworn-in on January 9. In that capacity he actively worked to recruit new industries and brought corporate executives on tours in North Carolina to convince them to invest in the state. In the summer of 1961, Sanford and Bowles jointly decided to racially integrate North Carolina's state parks. In 1962, Bowles promulgated an official policy desegregating park facilities.

That summer Bowles resigned from the directorate of the Department of Conservation and Development to free up more of his time to devote to his businesses. Sanford in turn designated him as chairman of the department's policy-making board of directors; Bowles switched jobs on August 2. Sanford later placed him on the board of directors of the North Carolina Fund. Though Sanford finished his term with a high rate of unpopularity, Bowles remained a staunch ally and defender of his administration. Bowles left the department chairmanship on June 30, 1965.

Legislative career 
In November 1966 Bowles ran for as one of seven candidates for six seats in the North Carolina House of Representatives for Guilford County. He placed fourth with 22,670 votes and secured one of the seats. Bowles was later elected to two terms in the North Carolina Senate.

1972 gubernatorial election 

Bowles long aspired to be elected governor of North Carolina. In 1972, he declared himself a candidate in the Democratic primary for the gubernatorial race. Fashioning himself as a progressive centrist, he emphasized his support for expanding the state's community college system and technical education opportunities to strengthen the economy while opposing tax increases. He was opposed in his bid by Lieutenant Governor Hoyt Patrick Taylor Jr., the early favorite of Democratic leaders, black dentist Reginald Hawkins, and labor unionist Wilbur Hobby.

Bowles inherited much of Sanford's old coalition and anticipated receiving strong backing from residents of Guilford County. Wealthy and an active alumnus of UNC, he had personal financial resources he could devote to his campaign and was familiar with many state business leaders. He distanced himself from incumbent Democratic Governor Robert W. Scott, who had cultivated several political enemies. While traditional campaigns involving stump speeches and newspaper advertising were still the norm in the state at the time, Bowles used newer techniques to reach voters, placing an emphasis on television commercials. Aided by consultant Walter DeVries, his campaign used focus groups and survey research to gauge issues which mattered most to the electorate. Mindful of their value in a primary runoff scenario, he also quietly pursued the good faith of black voters. Bowles led in the May primary with 367,433 votes with strong performance in all of the state's regions and major metropolitan areas. Taylor finished second with 309,919.

Taylor called for a primary runoff. The campaign became increasingly bitter, with most Sanford supporters backing Bowles and the majority of Scott supporters working for Taylor. Bowles won the Democratic primary runoff in June with 336,035 votes to Taylor's 282,345. Moves towards unifying the party behind the nominee were complicated lingering bitterness harbored by Scott and Taylor supporters. Bowles joked that after he won the governorship his allies would "get the white meat" while the backers of other primary candidates would "get the dark meat", angering Taylor supporters.

He lost the general election to Republican James Holshouser, leading in much of eastern North Carolina but losing the west, the piedmont, and several metropolitan areas. He was the first Democratic nominee to lose a North Carolina gubernatorial race in the 20th century. Many Democratic leaders blamed Bowles' loss on his failure to unify his party.

Bowles remained optimistic about running again in 1976. In 1975 he mass mailed out a circular calling for help in an anticipated campaign. Lieutenant Governor Jim Hunt, set on launching his own campaign for the Democratic nomination, quickly moved to secure commitments from Bowles' former supporters. He also attempted to unseat State Democratic Party Chairman James Sugg, a key Bowles supporter. On March 25, 1976, Bowels declared that he would not run, citing cardiovascular trouble. He later endorsed former State Senator George Wood in the primary.

Later life 
Bowles later became known for his service to and fundraising for the University of North Carolina at Chapel Hill, from which he graduated in 1941. UNC's Center for Alcohol Studies is named for him.

Bowles died on September 7, 1986 at his home in Greensboro from complications of Lou Gehrig's disease. His son, Erskine Bowles, followed his father both into the investment banking business and into politics.

Notes

Works cited 
 
 
 
  - See profile at Google Books

External links

1919 births
1986 deaths
Democratic Party members of the North Carolina House of Representatives
Democratic Party North Carolina state senators
Neurological disease deaths in North Carolina
Deaths from motor neuron disease
University of North Carolina at Chapel Hill alumni
People from Monroe, North Carolina
Candidates in the 1972 United States elections
20th-century American politicians
American military personnel of World War II